Disney Research is a network of research labs supporting The Walt Disney Company. Its purpose is to pursue scientific and technological innovation to advance the company's broad media and entertainment efforts.

It has facilities in Los Angeles, Zurich and Edinburgh. Research topics include computer graphics, video processing, computer vision, robotics, radio and antennas, wireless communications, human-computer interaction, displays, data mining, machine learning, and behavioral sciences. The lab in Cambridge, Massachusetts was closed in January 2016.

Disney Research is managed by an internal Disney Research Council co-chaired by Disney-Pixar's Ed Catmull and including the directors of the individual labs.

Notable works
BB-8 was a physical prop developed by Disney Research, created by special effects artist Neal Scanlan.

See also

Walt Disney Imagineering

References

External links
 
 

Carnegie Mellon University
Disney technology
Research organizations in the United States